Felix and Meira is a 2014 Canadian drama film directed by Maxime Giroux, and starring Martin Dubreuil, Hadas Yaron, and Luzer Twersky. It is about an improbable affair between two Montreal residents - one a married woman from a devoutly Jewish family and community, and the other a single French Canadian man with his own family issues.

The film premiered in the Contemporary World Cinema section at the 2014 Toronto International Film Festival, where it won the Award for Best Canadian Film. It received numerous other film festival awards, and was nominated for five Canadian Screen Awards, including Best Motion Picture.

Plot
In Mile End, Montreal, a Hasidic Jewish woman named Meira lives a repressed life, married to Shulem, who does not allow her to listen to secular music. They have a young daughter named Elishiva, but Meira confides in her friend that she does not want any more children, despite their religious duty. Word reaches Shulem, who berates Meira for shaming the small family. By chance, Meira meets Félix, a French Canadian man who has just lost his father Théodore, who at the end of his life no longer knew Félix was his son. Meira is mystified by the fact that Félix has no children, as he is single, a novel concept for her, since she comes from a culture where women have as many as 20 children. She avoids eye contact with him, and becomes enraged when, while they are playing Ping-Pong, Félix's sister Caroline unexpectedly arrives and sees her.

Félix and Meira go out dancing. Caroline also informs Félix that their mother had an affair, drawing parallel to Félix's interest in a married woman. Eventually, Shulem sees Félix and Meira walking on a street together, rushes up behind them, and begins slapping Félix.

Later, Shulem visits Félix in his apartment, informing him that if Meira and Félix re-unite, Meira will never be allowed to return to the Hasidic community. Shulem also asks Félix to keep Meira safe and cared for. Before leaving, Shulem notices a folded-up piece of paper, that Félix says was written by Théodore and never read. Shulem reads it, revealing Théodore apologized for bullying Félix to conform to the family, where he never felt comfortable. Félix and Meira take Elishiva to Venice.

Cast
 Martin Dubreuil as Félix
 Hadas Yaron as Meira
 Luzer Twersky as Shulem
 Anne-Élisabeth Bossé as Caroline
 Benoît Girard as Théodore
 Melissa Weisz as Ruth

Production

Felix and Meira was director Maxime Giroux's third full-length film, and he said that in writing and directing it, he learned more about his home of Montreal. Additionally, he said he lived near Hasidic Jews on Mile End, and knew it was particularly challenging for women to leave the culture. While meeting and discussing possible stories with co-writer Alexandre Laferrière at cafes, Giroux said: "We'd see these women and men walking by, and we just didn't know anything about them." Laferrière did much of the research.

Giroux assembled a cast, including actors who were once Hasidic Jews, but later gave up that faith and culture. He commented: "It's their story in a way, and I know at some point, it was difficult for them to shoot some of the scenes because it was really close to what they lived in their lives. It's tough for them to re-invent themselves and have a new life in our society." It was challenging to cast Yiddish-speaking actors in Montreal, but in New York, several people pointed Giroux to Luzer Twersky, who they said would be interested.
The producers recommended Hadas Yaron, but as she did not speak French or Yiddish, she had to study both languages, working on Yiddish with Twersky and on French in Israel.

Release
Felix and Meira premiered in the Contemporary World Cinema section at the 2014 Toronto International Film Festival. It was also in competition at the San Sebastián International Film Festival, and at the Torino Film Festival. In January 2015, it screened at the New York Jewish Film Festival.

The film had a wider release in Quebec theatres on 30 January 2015, distributed by FunFilm, and had a limited release in the United States on 17 April 2015. It was released on DVD on 12 May 2015. By September 2015, the film had played in over 50 festivals and 15 countries.

Reception

Critical reception
The film received positive reviews, with a 77% approval rating on Rotten Tomatoes, based on 44 reviews. It was included in the list of "Canada's Top Ten" feature films of 2014, selected by a panel of film-makers and industry professionals organized by TIFF.  wrote in La Presse that the film was not sensational, but subtle, sensitive, and highly interesting. Brendan Kelly, writing for The Montreal Gazette, gave the film four stars, praising it as "so powerful precisely because it's so under-stated".

Outside Canada, Joe McGovern of Entertainment Weekly gave it a B. Jeannette Catsoulis, writing for The New York Times, called it "a tenderly observed love story". Ty Burr wrote in The Boston Globe that the film avoided melodrama about cultural conflicts to focus on its characters, and criticized the Motion Picture Association of America for giving the film an R rating, though there is a scene where Meira watches a couple have sex. Variety'''s Peter Debruge said it was easy to root for Meira's liberation, but he was not satisfied with the ending. Conversely, Jordan Hoffman, of The New York Daily News'', felt it lacked chemistry.

Accolades
The film was selected as the Canadian entry for the Best Foreign Language Film at the 88th Academy Awards, but it was not nominated.  It was a rare Canadian submission for featuring a substantial amount of Yiddish as well as French.

See also
 Twist of Faith (2013 film)
 List of submissions to the 88th Academy Awards for Best Foreign Language Film
 List of Canadian submissions for the Academy Award for Best Foreign Language Film

References

External links
 
 Félix et Meira at Cinoche.com

2014 films
2014 drama films
Canadian drama films
2010s English-language films
Films set in Montreal
Films set in Venice
2010s French-language films
Yiddish-language films
Films directed by Maxime Giroux
Jewish Canadian films
Films about Orthodox and Hasidic Jews
2014 multilingual films
Canadian multilingual films
2010s Canadian films